Neverland is a Big Finish Productions audio drama based on the long-running British science fiction television series Doctor Who.

Plot
As the paradox from the R-101 airship starts to unravel time and space, The Doctor and Charley, together with President Romana, go beyond the confines of our Universe to a world populated by "neverpeople", those who exist outside of time and space. It is in this Neverland that the Doctor uncovers the origins of a legend from the earliest days of Gallifrey's history that tells the story of a powerful Time Lord and a creature from an ancient nursery rhyme known as Zagreus.

Cast
The Doctor — Paul McGann
Charley Pollard — India Fisher
Romana — Lalla Ward
The Observer — Don Warrington
Matrix Voices — Jonathan Rigby, Dot Smith and Ian Hallard
Co-ordinator Vansell — Anthony Keetch
Kurst — Peter Trapani
Perineum — Holly King
Emperor — Alistair Lock
Under-Cardinal — Lee Moone
Rorvan — Mark McDonnell
Taris — Nicola Boyce

External links
Big Finish Productions - Neverland

2002 audio plays
Eighth Doctor audio plays
Gallifrey audio plays